Below is the list of National Assemblies of Namibia, including the Constituent Assembly, which was formed prior to independence in order to write the Constitution of Namibia.

 Constituent Assembly (1989–90)
 1st National Assembly (1990–95)
 2nd National Assembly (1995-2000)
 3rd National Assembly (2000-2005)
 4th National Assembly (2005-2010)
 5th National Assembly (2010-2015)
 6th National Assembly (2015-2020)
 7th National Assembly (2020–present)

National Assembly (Namibia)
Lists of politicians lists